Jack Dennis Williams (born 11 September 1997) is an English footballer who plays as a defender.

Career

Queens Park Rangers
Williams joined the QPR Academy as a nine-year old. On 10 March 2017, he joined Bishop's Stortford on work experience, where he made 8 appearances in the National League South. 
On 7 January 2019, Williams left the club after his registration was cancelled.

Wycombe Wanderers (loan)
On 31 July 2017 Williams joined Wycombe Wanderers on loan, he made his professional debut against Fulham in the EFL Cup on 8 August 2017 and he made his League Two debut on 19 August 2017 against Notts County.

Career statistics

References

External links

1997 births
Living people
English footballers
Association football defenders
Queens Park Rangers F.C. players
Bishop's Stortford F.C. players
Wycombe Wanderers F.C. players
English Football League players
National League (English football) players